The DASH Industry Forum (DASH-IF) creates interoperability guidelines on the usage of the MPEG-DASH streaming standard, promotes and catalyzes the adoption of MPEG-DASH, and helps transition it from a specification into a real business. It consists of the major streaming and media companies, such as Microsoft, Netflix, Google, Ericsson, Samsung and Adobe.

Interoperability 
One of the main goals of the DASH Industry Forum is to attain interoperability of DASH-enabled products on the market.

The DASH Industry Forum has produced several documents as implementation guidelines: 
 DASH-AVC/264 Interoperability Points V3.0: DRM updates, Improved Live, Ad Insertion, Events, H.265/HEVC support, Trick Modes, CEA608/708 
 DASH-AVC/264 Interoperability Points V2.0: HD and Multi-Channel Audio Extensions
 DASH-AVC/264 Interoperability Points V1.0

Open-Source Reference Player 
The DASH Industry Forum provides the open source MPEG-DASH player dash.js

See also 
 H.264/MPEG-4 AVC

References 

MPEG
Standards organizations in the United States